Takahan Ryokan is a historic ryokan (Japanese inn) located in Yuzawa, Niigata Prefecture, Japan. The inn is over 800 years old. The inn has an onsen (bath) called "Tamago no Yu" (English: egg-water) that is supplied by natural hot springs with a slight amount of sulfur. The inn has approximately 20,000 annual visitors, many of whom visit to soak in Tamago no Yu.

The setting for the book Snow Country authored by Yasunari Kawabata is based upon Takahan Ryokan's location. The inn has preserved the room that Kawabata stayed and wrote in when he was there, along with some of the author's personal effects.

References

Further reading
 Crab, eel, pork are lionized at the Dragon inn

External links
 Official website 

Hotels in Niigata Prefecture
Hot springs of Japan